Windows Libraries for OS/2 Development Kit (WLO) is a collection of dynamic-link libraries for OS/2 that allow Win16 applications to run on OS/2.

See also
 Microsoft Windows
 Cardfile

References

External links
  WLO 1.0 download (archived)

Compatibility layers
OS/2